Poverty in South Korea has been in drastic decline since the mid-20th century, particularly the absolute poverty rate. Relative poverty was also in decline until the late 1990s, but has risen since then. While only about 2% of South Koreans are affected by absolute poverty today, about 14-15% of these 2% are elderly and are affected by relative poverty.

Trends

Choo, Park and Yoon noted that both absolute and relative poverty have declined in Korea from 1965 to 1990. They concluded that "rapid economic growth during [the analyzed period of 1960s-1980s] in Korea has alleviated poverty to a great extent". Philips et al. praised South Korea, noting that "South Korea has experienced one of the most dramatic declines in absolute poverty that the world has seen". They added that while over half of the Korean population was affected by absolute poverty in mid-1950s, absolute poverty had declined to only about 3.4 percent of the population by the mid-1990s. As of 2001, absolute poverty was below 2% (however, another estimate for 2000 cited 11.5%). However, more recent data suggests that relative poverty has been on the rise, growing from about 8% in the early 1990s to 15% as of 2012.

According to official estimates, about 15% of South Koreans live below the poverty line. Poverty in South Korea is defined as relative poverty. It is important to note that relative poverty is not the same as absolute poverty: relative poverty measures the share of the population living on less than half of the median income. (Median income in South Korea in 2007 was $19,179 (W20m).) About half of all citizens over the age of 65 are living in poverty, one of the highest rates among OECD countries.

On November 15, 2021, according to reports, South Korea ranks fourth in the world in terms of relative poverty among major economies.

Poverty among Korean elderly
In the rapidly aging demographics in South Korea, many elderly require healthcare. Studies taken across many demographics concluded that South Korean elderly with low income lack proper social protection from the government and are the most disadvantaged. In recent years “the proportion of aged 65 and older among people with disabilities has quickly increased, from 30.3% to 43.3% in 2014”. That makes South Korea the leader in this aspect as 3 times the growth as compared to the international average.

26 percent of Korean elderly lived in poverty in 2008. Among OECD countries, the poverty risk is significantly higher for South Korea's elderly. While the number of elders living in poverty increases every year for many countries, South Korea remains with the highest poverty rate of people aged over 65 among the OECD countries. Moreover, the poverty risk is particularly high for the South Korean elderly who are less educated, living alone, living in a rural area, or are not in good health. Many low-income elderly individuals are currently living with their children, which are often providing them with financial aid, and many also depend on welfare transfers.

Reasons for poverty
OECD listed several factors among the reasons for poverty in Korea. First, public social spending in South Korea is low. Social spending by the government in South Korea was 7.6% of GDP in 2007, compared to the OECD average of 19%. This can be explained by the Korean traditional reliance on family and the private sector to provide such services. Second, Korea's dualistic labour market, in which a significant number of workers are hired only on temporary contracts with low wages and benefits, results in high inequality in wage income.

Income inequality

South Korea, along with many other East Asian countries, has been known for very equal distribution of income and wealth. However, this has been changing over the last few decades. Statistics show that in the 1990s, income equality reached a peak and has declined since then. This may be in part due to the country's rapid economic growth. In a now more competitive job market, the head of the household or householder is expected to be more educated, which makes it hard for rural families to compete with a lack of access to higher education, subsequently resulting in income inequality between urban and rural areas. Some attribute income inequality to a change in traditional household head dynamics in South Korea. An increase in single headed households and a stiflingly low access to new jobs has created a financially challenging situations for many families in South Korea, leading many not to have families at all.

Welfare state

South Korea has a seemingly brutal take on welfare and trade unions. Many trade unions and the opposition groups they represent have been shut down by the government. It was only within the last decade that a social security has been set up for the elderly, but many elderly still live in extreme poverty despite help from the government. South Korea has a comprehensive national healthcare for all of its citizens.

See also

 Bacchus Ladies - Elderly prostitutes who sell Bacchus-F energy drink and sex for a living

References

External links
 "Poverty is the number one cause of suicide among senior citizens."
 Poverty Combating Strategy in South Korea
 One quarter of South Koreans touched by poverty
 Understanding the Poverty Line, South Korea, October 2012
 Poverty worsening among South Korea's aged people